Paragorgorhynchus is a genus of worms belonging to the family Rhadinorhynchidae.

Species:

Paragorgorhynchus albertianus 
Paragorgorhynchus aswanensis 
Paragorgorhynchus chariensis

References

Acanthocephalans